Digby County is a county in the Canadian province of Nova Scotia.

History
It was named after the Township of Digby; this was named in honour of Rear Admiral Robert Digby, who dispatched HMS Atalanta to convey Loyalists from New York City in the spring of 1783 to Conway, which became known as Digby, as part of their evacuation and resettlement following the American Revolutionary War. The Crown resettled thousands of Loyalists in Nova Scotia and other areas of Canada.  Digby County was established in 1837. Previously, from August 17, 1759, when Nova Scotia was first divided into counties, this area had been part of Annapolis County.

In 1861, Digby County was divided into two sessional districts: Digby and Clare. These were eventually incorporated as district municipalities in 1879.

In addition to these two district municipalities, the county contains the Town of Digby and part of the Bear River Indian (First Nations) reserve. Also, there is Digby Neck leading into the Bay of Fundy to Long Island and Brier Island.

Demographics 

Population trend

Mother tongue language (2011)

Ethnic groups (2006)

Communities

Towns
Digby

Villages
Freeport
Tiverton
Westport
Weymouth

Reserves
Bear River 6

District municipalities
Municipality of the District of Clare
Municipality of the District of Digby

Access routes
Highways and numbered routes that run through the county, including external routes that start or finish at the county boundary:

Highways

Trunk routes

Collector routes:

External routes:
None

Museums
The county's history is preserved at the Admiral Digby Museum as well as several community museums.

Notable people
Coline Campbell
Joseph Willie Comeau
Phil Comeau
Alfred Gilpin Jones
Herbert Ladd Jones
William M. Jones
Sam Langford
John Elkanah Morton
George Nowlan
Henri M. Robicheau
Adam Smith
Pop Smith
Robert Thibault
Martin Welch
Maud Lewis

See also
List of communities in Nova Scotia

References

 
1837 establishments in Nova Scotia